Rita Tani Iddi is a Ghanaian politician who was the member of parliament for the Gushiegu constituency from 2005 to 2009.

Rita won the Gushiegu seat during the December 2004 general election on the ticket of the New Patriotic Party (NPP) but lost in her next attempt to represent the constituency in the December 2008 general election. While in parliament, she doubled as the deputy Minister for Lands and Natural Resources in charge of Mines. She is currently the deputy Ghana commissioner to the United Kingdom and Ireland.

Early life and education 
Tani was born on 14 September 1949. She attended the University of Cape Coast were she attained a Diploma in Home Science, after which she furthered her education at the University of Education, Winneba, where she obtained her Bachelor of Education in Home Science.

Career 
Rita Tani Iddi is a teacher by profession, she taught in several schools in Ghana, these included Yendi Senior High School and Berekum Training College. She was appointed a District Chief Executive of the Gushegu District in the Northern Region of Ghana. She also became a member of parliament of the Fourth Parliament for the Fourth Republic of Ghana representing the Gushegu constituency and served as a Deputy Minister for Lands, Forestry and Mines who was in charge of the mines sector during His Excellency the Ex-President of Ghana, John Agyekum Kufuor's administration and was de Deputy High Commissioner for Ghana. Tani Iddi is also a Ghanaian politician.

Politics 
Rita Tani is a Ghanaian politician, who contested in the 2004 Ghanaian general elections as a member of parliament for the Gushegu constituency in the Northern Region of Ghana on the ticket of the New Patriotic Party. She won the elections with a total vote cast of 14,643 representing 52.80% over her opponent, Iddrisu Hudu of the National Democratic Congress who obtained 13,108 total votes cast representing 47.20%, making her a member of Parliament for the Fourth Parliament of the Fourth Republic of Ghana.

She also served as the Deputy Minister of Lands, Forestry and Mines in charge of the mines sector during the Kufour's Administration.

Personal life 
Rita Tani is Christian by religion.

See also
 List of MPs elected in the 2004 Ghanaian parliamentary election
 Gushiegu (Ghana parliament constituency)

References

Ghanaian MPs 2005–2009
Women members of the Parliament of Ghana
20th-century Ghanaian women politicians
21st-century Ghanaian women politicians
Living people
1949 births
Ghanaian MPs 2001–2005
New Patriotic Party politicians